Antonio Bellavista (born 19 November 1977) is an Italian footballer who is retired. He played as a midfielder.

Career

Early career
He grows in Bitonto and then he passed to A.S. Bari.

Bari
Bellavista passed in 1995–1996 season in the first team of Bari, but he didn't play.

Pistoiese
He joined to Pistoiese for a season. He played 6 matches, (0 goals).

Bari
He returned to Bari for a season, but he played only 2 matches (0 goals).

Giulianova
He joined to Giulianova, and he grows very much. He played for a season (31 matches, 1 goal).

Treviso
He joined to Treviso for a season and he played 24 matches (1 goal).

Bari
He returned to Bari from 1999 to 2007. Bellavista played 248 matches (6 goals).
He played for 2 seasons (42 games, 1 goal) in the Serie A for A.S. Bari.

Verona
He joined to Verona in 2008–2009 season. He played 33 matches (1 goal)

Andria BAT
He returned in Apulia in 2009 with Andria BAT. He played 6 matches (0 goals)

Bellavista was given a 5-year suspension in June 2011 following his involvement in the 2011–12 Italian football scandal.

References

External links
Profile at Goal.com

1977 births
Living people
People from Bitonto
Italian footballers
Italy youth international footballers
Serie A players
Serie B players
Serie C players
U.S. Pistoiese 1921 players
S.S.C. Bari players
Giulianova Calcio players
Treviso F.B.C. 1993 players
Hellas Verona F.C. players
S.S. Fidelis Andria 1928 players
Association football midfielders
Footballers from Apulia
Sportspeople from the Metropolitan City of Bari